Emma Sarah Morton-Smith  (born 7 August 1977) is an English singer-songwriter and presenter.

Music career
After completing a GNVQ qualification in Fashion Design at Stockport College, Emmie became known for the UK No. 5 hit single "More Than This" in 1999, a cover version of Roxy Music's 1982 song. She became the singer of the track when she met record producer Mark Hadfield (of bands Loveland, Urban Cookie Collective, Rhythm Quest, Lucid & Lovefreekz) at a party in their hometown. Bryan Ferry gave his blessing.

Also in 1999, she was featured in the video for the single "Your Caress" by DJ Flavours.

While a student at Stockport College, she frequented the same nightclub that Sarah Harding from Girls Aloud used to promote. A second single "I Thought It Was You" was planned to be released in 2000 but was cancelled. The single would finally be released digitally in 2014.

Another solo single, "I Won't Let You Down", with W.I.P., was released on 4 February 2002, a cover version of the 1982 song by Ph.D. This reached No. 53 in the UK Singles Chart. Apart from that, only one other low-profile release appeared under the "Emmie" name, "You Only Hurt (The One You Love)" (1999).

Under the name Indien, with producer and husband Mark Hadfield, the single "Show Me Love" was released on 28 July 2003, and reached No. 69 in the UK Singles Chart. Then, the single "Who's the Daddy?" was released, with her as part of the group Lovebug, on 29 September 2003, and was featured in an advertisement for Asda's George clothing range in the same year. This reached No. 35 in the UK.

Presenting career and other projects
Since 2004, she became focused on her presenting career. In late 2004, won a competition for 'Traffic Idol' on the North West regional radio station, 105.4 Century FM, to become the new afternoon traffic and travel presenter on Century, and on the Manchester frequency of Capital Gold. However, as of 2008, she no longer works for GMG Radio as a co-presenter on Century FM. Emma is currently a presenter on Heart Yorkshire Radio where she co-hosts the Dixie and Emma Drivetime Show. She is a celebrity reporter on Channel M, has a regular presenter slot on QVC, and does web presenting, for example on videotile.co.uk. She has also presented Noddy's Electric Ladyland for Granada.

She started her own fashion business called www.bigwardrobe.com, which is now defunct.

Discography

More Than This 99 (Manifesto FES52, 1999 UK#5)
 Radio Edit (3:10)
 Original 12" (6:25)
 Sunset Dub (5:27)
 Translucid Vocal (7:18)
 Tin Tin Out Remix (6:49)
 Clear (Bonus Track) (3:59)
 Loafers Oven Ready Mix (10:00) – originally issued on promo compilations in 1998

You Only Hurt (The One You Love) (Indirect Records IND05, 1999 unreleased)
 Radio Edit (3:34)
 Futureshock Vocal Remix (9:29)
 Futureshock Dub Mix (6:58)

I Thought It Was You (Telstar STAS3144, 2000 unreleased until 2014)
 Radio Edit (3:59)
 JF Paris Edit (4:22)
 Lucid Club Mix (7:27)
 Dark Vocal Master (7:29)
 Lucid Dub (6:58)
 JF Paris 12" (6:46)
 Rob Searle Mix (6:45)

I Won't Let You Down (as W.I.P. featuring Emmie) (Decode/ Telstar STAS3210, 2002 UK#53)
 Darren Tate's Angelic Radio Edit (3:36)
 Original Radio Edit (3:33)
 W.I.P. Original Mix (7:34)
 Soul Fader remix (8:26)
 Darren Tate's Angelic Remix (8:43)
 Jay Welsh Black Ice Remix
 Yetari remix
 JS10 Remix

Show Me Love (as Indien) (Concept Music CON40, 2003 UK#69)
 Flip & Fill Radio Edit (3:12)
 Flip & Fill Remix (5:45)
 Red Room Main/ Original Mix (7:02)
 LMC Remix (5:55)

Who's The Daddy? (as Lovebug) (Sony Music 674270 UK#35)
 Radio Edit
 12" Mix
 12" King Remix

References

External links
 
 

1977 births
Living people
People from Stockport
English dance musicians
English women singer-songwriters
English radio presenters
English television presenters
English women pop singers
21st-century English women singers
21st-century English singers
British women radio presenters